Ewan Hooper (born 23 October 1935 in Dundee) is a Scottish actor who is a graduate from, and now an Associate Member of, RADA. Hooper was the motivating force in the foundation of the Greenwich Theatre, which opened in 1969. Hooper was the founder director of the Scottish Theatre Company formed in Glasgow in the 1980s. He is best remembered as the priest in Dracula Has Risen from the Grave, along with a recurring role as Camp Controller Alec Foster in Jimmy Perry and David Croft's Hi-de-Hi!.

Selected filmography
 How I Won the War (1967)
 Dracula Has Risen from the Grave (1968)
 Julius Caesar (1970)
 Personal Services (1987)
 Kinky Boots (2005)
Across the lake (1988)

Television roles

He appeared as Sergeant Moran in the 1966 The Avengers episode "What the Butler Saw". He also was Detective Sergeant Smith in 1970s series Hunters Walk.

Selected theatre performances
 Mr Hardcastle in She Stoops to Conquer by Oliver Goldsmith. Directed by James Maxwell at the Royal Exchange, Manchester. (1990)
 Mr Jeffcote in Hindle Wakes by Stanley Houghton. Directed by Helena Kaut-Howson at the Royal Exchange, Manchester. This was the production in performance at the time of the 1996 Manchester bombing. It was also the production which opened the restored theatre two years later.  (1996) and (1998)
 Leonato in Much Ado About Nothing. Directed by Helena Kaut-Howson  at the Royal Exchange, Manchester. Hooper won a (MEN Award) for his performance. (1997)
 Rev. Samuel Gardner in Mrs Warren's Profession by George Bernard Shaw. Directed by Helena Kaut-Howson  at the Royal Exchange, Manchester. (2000)
 Mr Kirk in Outlying Islands by David Greig. Directed by Loveday Ingram at the Ustinov, Theatre Royal Bath (2006)
 Gonzalo in The Tempest. Directed by Greg Hersov  at the Royal Exchange, Manchester. (2007)

Personal life 
Hooper is married to an actress.

External links 
 

Living people
1935 births
People from Dundee
People educated at the High School of Dundee
Alumni of RADA
Scottish male television actors
Male actors from Dundee